Mary B. Verner (born August 13, 1956) is an American politician who served as the 42nd Mayor of Spokane, Washington from 2007 to 2011.

Early life and education 

Originally from Fitzgerald, Georgia, Verner received a Bachelor of Arts degree in Anthropology from Davidson College, earned her Master of Arts degree in environmental management from Yale University, and a Juris Doctor degree from Gonzaga University School of Law.

Career 
She has served as Executive Director of the Upper Columbia United Tribes. She was the third woman to become mayor of Spokane and the first woman since a mayor–council government program was instituted in the place of a previous council–manager government system. 

Verner served on the City Council for four years before becoming mayor. Originally appointed to the council, Verner was subsequently elected to the position from which she ran for Mayor against an incumbent, Dennis Hession in 2007. Verner won with 53% of the vote, becoming Spokane's 43rd mayor on November 27, 2007. She was the city's fifth mayor in eight years.

Verner was defeated for reelection in the 2011 Spokane mayoral election.

References

External links
 Office of the Mayor

1956 births
Living people
Mayors of Spokane, Washington
Davidson College alumni
Gonzaga University alumni
Yale College alumni
Women mayors of places in Washington (state)
People from Fitzgerald, Georgia